Mang Kanor is a 2023 Philippine erotic independent film written and directed by Greg Colasito. It stars Rez Cortez, Nika Madrid, Rob Sy, Joni McNab and Seon Quintos. The film is about how the life of a businessman changed when his sex videos became viral.

Cast
 Rez Cortez as Mang Kanor
 Nika Madrid as Sandra 
 Rob Sy as Bart
 Joni McNab as Linday 
 Seon Quintos as Tisoy
 Emelyn Cruz as Lyka
 Rain Perez as Young Mang Kanor
 John Rhey Flores as Cesar
 Carlo Mendoza as Julius
 Via Veloso as Aling Lydia
 Marlon Mance as Paul
 Atty. Aldwin Alegre as Atty Galvez
 Chai-Chai as Betty
 Sherilyn Reyes as Maegan
 Purple Conde as Sheng
 Judy Ann Marasigan as Rose
 Merab Soriano as Emily
 Princess Latiza as Mildred

Controversies
On January 20, 2023, The Movie and Television Review and Classification Board (MTRCB) issued Notices to Appear on to three entities concerning the exhibition of the motion picture Mang Kanor, and its related publicity materials.

Release
Mang Kanor was released on January 28, 2023, by AQ Prime.

Soundtrack

Magbabalik
Composer: Carlo Alvarez, 
Performed by Random Mischief, 
Mixed and mastered by Sean Tuesday, 
Release by Blackbox Records 2022

Intro
Composer: Sean Tuesday, Performed by Sean Tuesday
October 2022

 Saying No Means Goodbye 
Composer: Sean Tuesday, Performed by Sean Tuesday
October 2022

 Mother and Son
Composer: Sean Tuesday, Performed by Sean Tuesday, October 2022

 Three Is Not A Crowd
Composer: Sean Tuesday, Performed by Sean Tuesday, October 2022

 Tiboy's Charm
Composer: Sean Tuesday, Performed by Sean Tuesday, October 2022

 Kanor's True Love
Composer: Sean Tuesday, Performed by Sean Tuesday, October 2022

 Lust Crusade
Composer: Sean Tuesday, Performed by Sean Tuesday, October 2022

 Something is Missing
Composer: Sean Tuesday, Performed by Sean Tuesday, October 2022

 To All The Girls I F@*ked Before
Composer: Sean Tuesday, Performed by Sean Tuesday, October 2022

References

External links
 

Philippine erotic films